ABC 17 may refer to one of the following television stations in the United States:

Current
KBMY in Bismarck, North Dakota
KMIZ in Columbia/Jefferson City, MO
WTVO in Rockford, Illinois

Former
KLYD-TV/KJTV (now KGET) in Bakersfield, California (1959 to 1974)
WTVP/WAND in Decatur/Champaign/Urbana/Springfield, Illinois (1953 to 2005)
WITV (now occupied by WLRN-TV) in Miami/Fort Lauderdale, Florida (1953 to 1957)
WJKS (now WCWJ) in Jacksonville, Florida (1966 to 1980 and 1988 to 1997)